George Thengummoottil (born 10 January 1985) is an Indian filmmaker and editor.

Early life and education

George was born in the town of Palakkad, Kerala on 10 January 1985. George Thengummoottil did his primary school education at Marthoma Senior Secondary School. He did his graduation in Computer Science at Marian College Kuttikkanam, Peermade. During when he wrote his first book The Story of Peermade, a book about the history of Peermade. He obtained Masters in Computer Science from Dr G R Damodaran College of Science, Coimbatore and later another Masters in Communication and Journalism from PSG College of Arts and Science, Coimbatore. He has also completed short course on Application of Sound in Film and Television from Satyajit Ray Film and Television Institute.

During his teenage, he was affected by Keratoconus, a degenerative disorder of the eye and was blind by the age of 13. He had to stop his studies and activities. Later he did Corneal transplantation and could partially recover vision in one of his eyes.

Career
George was campus placed in Machine Vision and Robotics at Lucid Imaging, Bangalore after his post graduation. Even though the company offered cover of his treatments he could not continue for a long time due to Keratoconus. George was invited to work as a lecturer at Sherubtse College in Bhutan, where he served for several Years. Later he worked as a journalist with Times of India, Coimbatore and later worked with filmmaker Sandesh Kadur at Felis Creations before starting as an independent wildlife filmmaker.

Film making
After his Masters in Journalism, he started making small edits, while working at Felis Creations and started as a documentary editor.

George was also motivational speaker and has been involved in many technical and art projects. He was instrumental to popularize the use of solar panels for filming in remote places.

Community Initiatives
George is the founder of Keratoconus Foundation India, a charitable trust registered under Indian Trusts Act, 1882 which guides Keratoconus patients in India to lead a better life and support them economically.

Books

Filmography

External links
 Personal Website

References 

Living people
Artists from Palakkad
1985 births
Indian documentary film editors
Indian documentary film directors
Film editors from Kerala
Film directors from Kerala
Film directors from Bangalore
People from Palakkad